Leia Zhu (born October 2006 in Newcastle upon Tyne) is a British-Chinese classical violinist.

By the age of 12, Leia had performed at some of the most prestigious concert halls in more than 18 countries; at the same age, she became the youngest artist to be managed by the London based global agency HarrisonParrott.

At the age of 14, Leia was appointed Artist-in-Residence with the London Mozart Players in 2021.

During pandemic, in August 2021, Leia was invited to performed Introduction and Rondo Capriccioso by Saint-Saëns with London Symphony Orchestra under the baton of Sir Simon Rattle of at BMW Classics with thousands of audience in London Trafalgar Square watched the performance live and it was spontaneously live streamed worldwide.

In December 2021, Zhu joined the Irish band Westlife in their WeChat live stream with 27 million views by performing a violin solo in ‘You Raise Me Up’.

In May 2022, at the age of 15 Leia became a Patron of The HarrisonParrott Foundation with focus on expanding interest in classical music for all generations

In July 2022, aged 15, Leia was the youngest musician, after pianist Bruce Liu, 25, and conductor Klaus Mäkelä, 26, to be included on the list of 30 brilliant young musicians all under the age of 30 by Classic FM for its 30th birthday special edition.

In November 2022, aged 16, Leia was appointed as Education Ambassador by the London Mozart Players to take part in a variety of education activities including workshops, masterclasses and careers insights days with students and to serve as peer inspiration for young people.

Early life and education 
Leia Zhu was born in Newcastle upon Tyne, England. Her father is an IT professional, and her mother is a business consultant.

During the week, she attends a boarding school in Oxford. On weekends, Zhu, together with her younger brother, Leo, attend Junior Guildhall of Guildhall School of Music and Drama, until Leo started studying in Eton College in 2021.

Leia studies violin with Professor Itzhak Rashkovsky. She also regularly takes master classes with Professor Zakhar Bron.

From  infancy Zhu loved the sound of stringed instruments. She began playing the violin at the age of three and a half after receiving a toy violin as a present from her grandmother.

At the age of 4, she made her debut at the North East Last Night of the Proms in Newcastle City Hall in front of thousands.

At the age of 5, Zhu joined the English Philharmonic Ensemble for the Candlelit Christmas Concert Tour in four cities in North England.

In January 2013, Zhu, at the age of 6, was invited by the Los Angeles-based Classical Concert Chamber Orchestra to perform as a soloist during a nine-city tour in Spain.

Career

As a soloist  
Aged 8, Moscow Gnessin Special School of Music Orchestra performing Mendelssohn Violin Concerto in E minor 2nd and 3rd Movement (September 2015)

Aged 9, Russian National Orchestra performing Mendelssohn Violin Concerto in E minor 3rd Movement (December 2015)

Aged 9, London Schools Symphony Orchestra performing Sibelius's Humoresque No 2 Opus 87 (February 2016) and they collaborate on the same piece in September 2016

Aged 9, Surgut Philharmonic performing the Tchaikovsky Violin Concerto 2nd and 3rd movements (April 2016)

Aged 9, Belgian National Orchestra performing Lalo Symphonie Espagnole 5th Movement under the baton of Maxim Vengerov (June 2016)

Aged 9, Lerman Chamber Orchestra performing Jules Massenet Méditation (Thaïs) (June 2016) and later toured 3 cities with the orchestra with one hour programme including Giuseppe Tartini - Devil's Trill Sonata; Tchaikovsky Souvenir d'un lieu cher, op. 42; Henri Wieniawski - Polonaise Brillante Op.4 No.1 in D Major; Encores: P.Sarasate - Navarra Op.33 for two violins (with Dinis Sattarov, concert master of LCO) J. Williams - Schindler's List (December 2017)

Aged 10, Moscow Philharmonic Orchestra performing Lalo Symphonie Espagnole 5th Movement. And together with Prof Zakhar Bron Sarasate Navara (December 2016)

Aged 10, Junior Guildhall School Symphony Orchestra performing Mendelssohn Violin Concerto in E Minor (December 2017)

Aged 10, The Symphony Orchestra at St Petersburg State Capella performing Paganini Violin Concerto No 1 (May 2017)

Aged 10, Festival Strings Lucerne performing Tchaikovsky Souvenir d'un lieu cher, op. 42 and Dance of the Goblins by Antonio Bazzini (June 2017)

Aged 10, Zurich Chamber Orchestra performing Bach Violin Concerto E major and Haydn Violin Concerto C major (October 2017)

Aged 11, Russian State Symphony Orchestra performing Carmen Fantasie by Waxman and together with Roby Lakatos Monti Czardas (November 2017)

Aged 11, Novosibirsk Symphony Orchestra performing Carmen Fantasie by Waxman (March 2018)

Aged 11, Tour with Kazan Chamber Orchestra La Primavera in 3 cities: Kazan, Naberezhnye Chelny and Nizhnekamsk, performing Mendelssohn's Concerto in D minor, Carmen fantasie for violin and orchestra by Bizet-Waxman and Swensen's romance for violin and orchestra( first performed in Kazan.)  (March 2018)

Aged 11, Festival Strings Lucerne performing Mozart Adagio KV 261 and Paganini La Campanella (September 2018)

Aged 12, Junior Guildhall School Symphony Orchestra  performing Tchaikovsky Violin Concerto (December 2018)

Aged 12, Tel Aviv Soloists Ensemble touring of 6 cities, Petach Tikva, Akko, Gush Etzion, Haifa, Tel-Aviv and Ashkelon in Israel and performing Mozart Violin Concerto No. 5, Sérénade mélancolique by Tchaikovsky, Carmen Fantasie by Waxman and Rondo Capriccioso for Violin and Orchestra by Camille Saint-Saëns  (January 2019)

Aged 12, The Mariinsky Orchestra performing Wieniawksi Violin Conerto No 1 (June 2019)

Aged 12, Festival Strings Lucerne touring of 3 cities in Switzerland and Germany and performing Paganini Cantabile and Paganini La Campanella (July 2019); later performing Havanaise in E major op. 83 by Saint-Saëns and Paganini La Campanella (September 2019)

Aged 12, Odessa National Academic Theatre of Opera and Ballet performing Saint-Saëns Concerto No 3 3rd Movement (October 2019)

Aged 12, London Mozart Players performing Salut d'Amour by Elgar and Paganini La Campanella (November 2019)

Aged 13, Classical Orchestra of Espinho performing Sibelius Violin Concerto (November 2019)

Aged 13, English Chamber Orchestra performing Dvorak Romance for Violin and orchestra op. 11 F minor and Mendelssohn Violin Concerto in E minor (February 2020)

Key festivals appearances 
Lucerne Festival

Salzburg Festival

MozartFest Würzburg

Musical Olympus Festival

White Nights Festival

Trans-Siberian Art Festival

Moscow Meets Friends

Golden Violin Festival Odessa

Rheingau Musik Festival

Other festivals appearances include Green Noise Festival (Russia) Hexham Music Festival(England) Interlaken Classics (Switzerland),  VI INTERNATIONAL FESTIVAL L'ARTE DEL ARCO (Russia), Lower Machen Festival (Wales), Festspiele Europäische Wochen Passau (Germany)

Prestigious halls Zhu has performed  
Tchaikovsky Concert Hall

Mariinsky Theatre

The Royal Festival Hall London

Barbican Centre

BOZAR in Brussels

KKL Lucerne

Tel Aviv Performing Arts Center

Odessa Opera and Ballet Theater

Cadogan Hall London

Berlin Philharmonie

Other notable places Zhu has performed to list but a few: Großer Saal Stiftung Mozarteum (Austria), Yehudi Menuhin Hall, European Parliament (Belgium), Odessa Philharmonic Theater (Ukraine), Würzburg Residence (Germany),  Rapperswil Castle (Switzerland),  Conservatorio di musica "Giuseppe Verdi" di Milano(Italy) Moscow Academic Musical Theater,  Moscow International House of Music, Newcastle Cathedral, Hexham Abbey, Beverley Minster, London Milton Court, St John's Smith Square (London), Royal College of Music, Windsor Castle, Palais Brongniart(Paris), Harmonie Club(New York)

Recitals and chamber music 
Aged 5, recital in St Mary's Heritage Centre, England (September 2012)

Aged 7, recital in Hexham Abbey, England

Aged 7, recital in Newcastle Cathedral, England, the leader of Royal Northern Sinfonia Bradley Creswick was a guest, together they performed Shostakovich 5 Pieces for 2 Violins (December 2014)

Aged 8, recital in Jona, Switzerland (April 2015)

Aged 9, recital in Lower Machen, Wales (June 2016)

Aged 9, chamber music concert at Berlin Philharmie lunch concert (October 2016)

Aged 10, two recitals in Southern Greece (May 2017)

Aged 10, with the leader of festival strings Daniel Dodds, Zhu played a selection of Bartók 44 Duos for 2 violins at Mozartfest Würzburg, Germany (June 2017)

Aged 10, with Noah Bendix-Balgley performed Sarasate Navarra at the chamber hall of Berlin Philharmonie, Berlin(September 2017) 

Aged 11, with Roby Lakatos performed Monti Czardas, Moscow (November 2017) 

Aged 11, recital at Milan Conservatory (Conservatorio di musica "Giuseppe Verdi" di Milano) Milan (June 2018) 

Aged 11, with cellist Amit PeledZoltan Kodaly's Duo for Violin and Cello, Op. 7 in Israel

Aged 12, With Professor Itzhak Rashkovsky performed Vivaldi Concerto for 2 Violins in A minor RV522 and Frolov Divertimento for two violins; With Professor Itzhak Rashkovsky, Professor Ani Schnarch, Professor Michael Vaiman performed Vivaldi Concerto in B minor RV580 accompanied by Odessa Philharmonic Orchestra at the Odessa Philharmonic Theatre, Ukraine.

Aged 13, recital in 1901 Art Club London (January 2020)

Aged 13, chamber music with members of Festival Strings Lucerne (violinist Daniel Dodds, cellist Jonas Iten and violaist Valentine Ruffieux) and pianist Benjamin Engeli in Lucerne, Switzerland (October 2020), programme includes Shostakovich 5 pieces for 2 violins and piano; Koaly violin cello duo and Antonin Dvořák Piano Quintet No. 2 in A major, Op. 81 for piano, 2 violins, viola, and cello

Other interests 
In addition to her busy international music performances, Zhu has trained at Sylvia Young Theatre School (weekend classes) and is taking a drama course at Junior Guildhall, National Youth Theatre as actor, singer, dancer, model and presenter. She also takes piano lessons regularly. She is now working to achieve Diploma level (DipABRSM), after gaining Grade 8 with Distinction awarded by Associated Board of the Royal Schools of Music (ABRSM)

Other hobbies include reading, writing and swimming. She is a keen filmmaker, one of her films made together with her brother Leo during pandemic was shortlisted by the prestigious Cinemagic 2020

Since 2020 
During pandemic, Zhu was commissioned by Epping Forest (City of London Corporation) to record Vivaldi's Summer movement II.

Zhu was due to perform Beethoven Violin Concerto with the festival orchestra at Interlaken Classics Festival on Easter Sunday, but the event was cancelled due to pandemic Zhu decided to perform this concerto online. She live streamed the performance on YouTube for an online audience.

Zhu also launched the partnership between Google Arts and Culture and HarrisonParrott; On her own YouTube channel and on Google Arts and Culture platform, Zhu shared her research and created a story introducing the composer Heinrich Wilhelm Ernst and performed two of his works The Last Rose of Summer and Der Erlkönig.

She made a series film/video news programmes with her brother Leo. The pair not only produced but also presented the news items, one of the films was shortlisted by the prestigious Cinemagic 2020.

Media coverage 
Zhu has performed in more than 20 countries to date. She has been featured by many media (newspaper, TV, radio) in UK, USA, Germany, Switzerland, Greece, Israel, Italy, Russia, Ukraine, Austria, Belgium, France and many more.

The Strad has featured Zhu's performances since she was eight years old. Wieniawski Second Violin Concerto (8-year-old), Mendelssohn Violin Concerto (8-year-old), Mendelssohn in E (9-year-old), Kreisler's Tambourin Chinois(9-year-old), Tchaikovsky Violin Concerto (9-year-old), Sibelius Humoresque(9-year-old), Mozart's Fifth Violin Concerto(10-year-old), Paganini's First Violin Concerto(10-year-old), Schubert Violin Sonata no.1 in D Major(10-year-old), Paganini La Campanella(11-year-old), Mendelssohn's D minor Violin Concerto(11-year-old),Carmen Fantasie(12-year-old), Zoltan Kodaly's Duo for Violin and Cello(12-year-old)

ClassicFM featured her performance of Dance of the Goblins by Bazzini when she was 10; Tchaikovsky's Scherzo (also 10) 'Tzigane' by Ravel when she was 13

Musiq'3 broadcast Zhu's live recording of Lalo Symphonie Espagnole 5th Movement with Belgian National Orchestra under the baton of Maxim Vengerov at BOZAR in Brussels when she was 9.

Deutschlandfunk Kultur broadcast her live recording of Tchaikovsky Souvenir d'un lieu cher op.42 with Festival Strings Lucerne at MozartFest Würzburg when she was 10.

BBC Radio 3 broadcast Zhu's live performance of Carmen Fantasie by Waxman with Novosibirsk Symphony Orchestra at the Trans-Siberian Art Festiva in 2018 when she was 11.

Reviews 
September 21, 2016, by Edward Clark, the President of UK Sibelius Society, of Leia's Barbican Centre Debut. He wrote:

'''There was the astonishing virtuosity of nine-year-old Leia Zhu who threw off Sibelius's Humoresque Opus 87 /2 with a speed and sense of feeling rivalled, in my experience, only by Aaron Rosand's recording. June 18, 2017, by Würzburg Main Post'Virtuously she was able to trace the composer's romantic cosmos with unspent freshness with a powerful, luminous tone. As an encore, she played the incredibly fast "Dance of the Goblins" by Antonio Bazzini - standing ovations for this exceptional talent.' June 20, 2017, by Würzburg Main Post, of Zhu's Bartok's 44 Duos for 2 Violins' with Daniel Dodds, concert master of Festival Strigs Lucerne'As a special guest, Leia Zhu, who played a selection from Bartók's "44 Duos for 2 Violins". In doing so, she was on an equal footing with her duo partner Dodds.

The young violinist, who, in addition to great artistic maturity, exuded a relaxed, calm friendliness, immediately received accolades.June 27, 2017, by Mannheimer Morgen, of Zhu's Tchaikovsky Souvenir d'un lieu cher op.42 with Festival Strings Lucerne'The performance of the 11-year-old violinist Leia Zhu became a special event.

She did not play with supposed childlike grace, not trained under ambitious parental pressure. The development of this amazing violin miracle happens in a natural maturation process. Her podium appearance was pretty self-confident.

The violinic capers resulted from the concept of the composition. Through all sorts of technical tricks such as double grips, rapid gliding to high registers, flageolets, pizzicatos, through her brilliant finger and bow technique as well as through her enormous feeling for the elegant and profound execution of the three movements of Souvenir d'un lieu cher op.42 (Memory to a beloved place) by Peter Tchaikovsky, this exceptional artistic talent has already proven to be largely developed and perfect in every phase.

Her technical ability, her remarkably mature expressiveness and the rhythmic pull of her playing led to enthusiastic applause.June 1, 2018, by the Strad, of Zhu's performance of Carmen Fantasie by Waxman with Novosibirsk Symphony Orchestra at the Trans-Siberian Art Festival, the Strad wrote:

'Eleven-year-old British violinist Leia Zhu demonstrated a disarming security in the pyrotechnics that followed, with lightning-fast shifts, cut-glass harmonics and an obvious familiarity with the choreography of concerto performance. June 7, 2018, by Corriere Milano, of Zhu's recital in Conservatorio di musica "Giuseppe Verdi" di Milano, it wrote:

'Not yet twelve years old is to present a musical programme like that heard last night in the conservatory for the Concert Society is particularly courageous.

This is what the amazing violinist Leia Zhu is doing around the world who has certainly not exaggerated in the choice of songs often of high virtuosity performed with her excellent  violin, indeed the songs performed they were absolutely within her reach and the executive maturity was that of a virtuous adult in his career for years.

It should be listened to closed eyes not to be conditioned, as often happens, right or wrong, by the words 'child prodigy'.

Nothing can be said to listen to justify of the age: Leia Zhu, the eleven – twelve in October – of Newcastle is perfect, highly expressive and overcomes any technical difficulty without any effort.

The variegated programme, which the talented Jennifer Hughes on the piano, foresaw a sonata of Beethoven, the Op. 12 No 3, then the Carmen Fantasie in the effective reworking of Waxman, then two works of Mozart as the Adagio in E major K261 and the Rondo in D major K 373, a violin solo with Fritz Kreisler and his Recitativo and Scherzo-Caprice Op 6. At the end is the famous Paganini La Campanella.

Splendid synergistic balance between the pianist and the violinist: Hughes was very attentive to the volumes of the small but tonally excellent violin of Zhu. Leia has been excellent both in the most classical and less virtuosically moments of Beethoven's sonata and Mozart songs, and in the every virtuosic situation from Carmen to Kreisler, to the well-known La Campanella, with those perfect in intonation and dynamic relationship.

The presence of the little girl in bright red dress, has underlines even more. An evening that will remain indelibly in the memories of the many in the Sala Verdi. All convinced and gave thunderous applause.

The two encores are excellent: Veracini, Largo from Sonata No 6 and Kreisler, the Marche miniature Viennoise. June 3, 2019, by Ynet News (Israel), of Zhu's performance at the Israel Conservatory of Music in Tel Aviv. It wrote:

'Zhu took the stage for the second piece on the program, the Concerto No. 5 for Violin—the Turkish—by Wolfgang Amadeus Mozart. The gifted young violinist performed flawlessly, demonstrating virtuosity throughout the three movements, whether the tempo was allegro, adagio or rondeaux-minuetto. July 13, 2019, by Osterhofener Anzeiger, of Zhu's performance of Paganini Cantabile, Paganini La Campanella and Bach Partita No. 3. It wrote:

'Deeply relaxed and devilishly sovereign

The game was also supernatural the only twelve year old Leia Zhu, not only, as one might think, drilled virtuosity, but rather showed a precocious seriousness that is second to none.

She convinced dream-walkers the audience with their velvety bow at the "Cantabile", where Paganini to the sound aesthetics the opera arias and it allows the solo instrument to indulge in large arcs of melody.

Leia Zhu proved that there is no relationship between age or talent of a person and her maturity and that artistic maturity is not required associated with human. Just while talking to the Osterhofener Anzeiger during the break, a little, almost shy girl who despite being deeply relaxed, Leia transforms into an adult full professional. Completely withdrawn and completely from the ingested music reaches them in the devilishly heavy violin magic of Paganini's "La Campanella", especially with her double-grip play, a level that one even without a child prodigy bonus amazes.

The joy of playing of all artists carried over that evening too on viewers who don't let go without any encores. So Leia Zhu, who found it "a great privilege" to "play in this spectacular place," gave Bach's "Partita No. 3" solo confidently to the best thing in this acoustics too sounded spectacular.July 13, 2019, by Osterhofener Anzeiger, of Zhu's performance of Paganini Cantabile, Paganini La Campanella with Festival Strings Lucerne. It wrote:

'The appearance of the British violinist Leia Zhu, who has Chinese roots, is almost even more spectacular is not even thirteen years old: a "child prodigy", as announced in the program. With Niccolò Paganini's "Cantabile" intones melt and sweetness, with smooth transitions between high register and sonorous depth. Of course, one was particularly excited beforehand to see how Leia Zhu performed the solo part of "La Campanella", Paganini's virtuoso bell rondo. Here nothing was left to be desired: like a savvy professional If the young violinist is up to Paganini's witchcraft, she leaves the bow light at a crazy pace Dance across the strings and amazes with rapid changes between bowed and pizzicato notes. September 19, 2019, by Oltner Tagblatt, of Zhu's performance of "Havanaise" in E major, op. 83 by the French Camille Saint-Saëns and Paganini La Campanella with Festival Strings Lucerne. It wrote:

'The young musician inspires the audience.'A schoolgirl in an overly long, red evening dress climbs the stage in the concert hall and smiles a little shyly: At first glance, Leia Zhu corresponds to the cliché we have of child prodigies. But then she starts the violin in front of a nearly sold out house and suddenly we no longer see a child's face, but the serious face of an adult artist. With verve and full of energy, she sets the tempo for the chamber orchestra and the excellent musicians of the Festival Strings Lucerne like to follow the dictation of the little virtuoso in the rhythmically strongly accented "Havanaise" in E major, op. 83 by the French Camille Saint-Saëns. With a maturity and seriousness that is absolutely amazing for her age, Leia creates this demanding dance piece. The beautiful, full tone of her violin fills the concert hall; Leia plays a valuable violin made by the Venetian violin maker Michele Deconet, which a private collector has made available to her on loan.

Immediately after the break, the likeable child star turns to what is probably the most famous of all violinists: Niccolò Paganini composed primarily to demonstrate his own virtuosity as an artist with his technically incredibly demanding works. Leia Zhu already masters some particularly demanding tone sequences in the almost romantic "Cantabile" in D major, Op. 17. "La Campanella" is considered Paganini's showpiece and is still a touchstone for string players to this day. Leia seems very confident, places the chords on top of each other in a flash and climbs dizzying heights with her instrument - she is visibly delighted with her skills. The young artist was rewarded by the enthusiastic audience with a standing ovation.

Leia Zhu said goodbye with a Bach encore, played bravely solo. What had one seen and heard: A gifted schoolgirl on the way to a great career.'October 13, 2020, by Luzerner Zeitung of Zhu's chamber music with members of Festival Strings Lucerne. It wrote:

For sure, she's the typical prodigy. At only 13 years old, she plays the violin and has the total control of all the technical difficulties. Almost at the same time she started going to school in Newcastle, she also joined the Guildhall School of Music in London. At the age of 7 she began to take masterclasses, then started playing concerts and soon appeared at festivals.

Everyone wanted to see and hear this British girl with Chinese roots. London, the Salzburg Festival, Moscow and the Berliner Philharmonie. In summer 2018, as the youngest in the "child prodigies" series at Lucerne Festival, Leia Zhu performed with the Festival Strings Lucerne.

AT 13, MATURE LIKE AN OLD SOUL

At the age of 13, mature like a veteran and yet when you look at this young lady on Sunday evening in the Hotel Schweizerhof at second concert of the new Chamber Music series of the «ChamberPlayers» the Festival Strings playing, your eyes could not believe what your ears hear.

Here is the expression 'the child prodigy' seems come from a different world. Leia's presentation and performance are astounding not simply because she is "young", but because it is convincing.

Together with Jonas Iten, principal cellist of the Festival Strings, Leia displayed a fiery mix of brilliance and depth in a most evocative way. Between them they performed this gripping music quite theatrically. The first movement passed mysteriously and eerily. Then the performance got denser until the wild steps in this dark mania got broken.

The second movement is gorgeous. The figures move in a nostalgic and fragile mood from the cello to the violin. A lost bit of earth, far away from homeland and security. Leia Zhu and Jonas Iten flow in these waves as if from a single body. Their playing is crystal clear. Sounds are chosen with care and transparency. A rich and inspiring moment.October 16, 2021, by Luzerner Zeitung of Zhu's Tchaikovesky Violin Concerto with Festival Strings Lucerne(without conductor). It wrote:

'''From Child Prodigy to Mature Artist'colorful, expressive, powerful.’'She ( Leia) communicates with the eyes, body tension and attention orchestral musicians.She looks very relaxed, smiles even in the most difficult passages, whether double stops, highest sounds or ludicrously fast runs, everything seems effortless.And as in the slow movement, the melodies breathe, long cantilenas bloom in dense legato, this is great art. The dialogues with clarinet and Flute are particularly intimate.

November 9, 2021, by Carrierebit of Leia Zhu Open the 41st Season of the Cantelli Festival in Novara'We confess that we were expecting the usual Chinese enfant prodigy, all astounding technical skill and zero interpretative and expressive ability. Our surprise in listening to her was great: Leia has already matured her own sound, her ability to make technical acrobatics not a spectacular end, but a means to give voice to a feeling, an emotion, a spiritual world evoked by sound.Her faring is intense, above all crystalline in the sound, even in the upper register, or in the very rapid scales and trills, but what struck us most is his excellent ability to vary dynamics with mature knowledge, colouring and returning a sound that is always rich in nuances and chiaroscuro.Hence the beautiful interpretative rendition of passages such as the Serenata and the Gavotta of the Italian Suite, but also the most fiercely virtuosic piece of Wieniawski's Fantasia came out of Leia Zhu's violin not as a cloying effect number, but as an effective and involving some of the most dramatic or pathetic moments in Gounod's work.

References

External links 
Official website 
Twitter 
Facebook 
Instagram 
YouTube

British violinists
Living people
2006 births
Chinese violinists